XHIRG-FM is a radio station on 102.7 FM in Irapuato, Guanajuato, Mexico. XHIRG is owned by Radiorama and carries a regional Mexican format known as Campirana.

History
XHIRG began as XEIRG-AM 1590, a daytimer, in November 1994. It moved to 1470 in 2007 and to 102.7 FM in 2011.

References

Radio stations in Guanajuato
Radio stations established in 1994
1994 establishments in Mexico
Mexican radio stations with expired concessions